The Carl L. Caviness Post 102, American Legion was built in 1925.  It reflects Late 19th and 20th Century Revivals architecture and was designed by Chariton architect William L. Perkins.  In its National Register of Historic Places nomination, it was deemed "a good example of the Revival styles popular in the 1920s", a well-preserved work by William L. Perkins and an illustration of "the importance of the American Legion in the social life of the community."  It was named in honor of Carl L. Caviness who was the first Lucas county resident to be killed in action during World War I.

It was individually listed on the National Register of Historic Places in 2006.  The listing included two contributing buildings, the second being an attached Quonset hut that was no longer in use.  In 2014 it was included as a contributing property in the Lucas County Courthouse Square Historic District.

References

Chariton, Iowa
American Legion buildings
Clubhouses on the National Register of Historic Places in Iowa
Buildings and structures completed in 1925
Buildings and structures in Lucas County, Iowa
National Register of Historic Places in Lucas County, Iowa
Individually listed contributing properties to historic districts on the National Register in Iowa